Miss World Philippines 2015 was the 5th edition of the Miss World Philippines pageant. It was held at the Solaire Resort & Casino in Parañaque, Philippines on October 18, 2015.

At the end of the event, Valerie Weigmann crowned Hillarie Parungao as Miss World Philippines 2015. Marita Cassandra Naidas was named as First Princess, Mia Allyson Howell as Second Princess, Maria Vanessa Wright as Third Princess, and Emma Tiglao as Fourth Princess.

Parungao represented the Philippines at the Miss World 2015 pageant in Crown of Beauty Theatre, Sanya, China and finished as a Top 10 finalist.

Results
Color keys
  The contestant was a Semi-Finalist in an International pageant.

Special Awards

Judges 

 Ben Chan – Founder of Bench and Chairman of the Board, Suyen Corporation
 Juan Miguel Zubiri – Former senator and former representative of the 3rd district of Bukidnon
 Chris Albert – President and CEO of Fila Philippines
 Fernando Carillo – Venezuelan actor
 Celine Matias – Assistant Vice President for Brand and Marketing of Phoenix Petroleum
 Jose Mari Abacan – Vice President for Program Management, GMA Network
 Kathleen Dy Go – General Manager of Universal Records Philippines
 Flint Carl Richardson – Chief Financial Officer, Solaire Resort & Casino
 Maria Francesca Tan – President and CFO of MFT Group of Companies
 Vic Alcuaz – President of Narra Hospitality Incorporated
 Col. Ricardo Nolasco – Owner of Hanna's Beach Resort and Convention Center
 Dr. Mary Jane Torres – Owner and Head Doctor of The Zen Institute
 Gov. Angelito Colona – Governor of District 3830, Rotary International
 Luis "Chavit" Singson – Former Governor of Ilocos Sur and Former Deputy National Security Adviser
 Megan Young – Actress, Miss World 2013

Contestants 
26 contestants competed for the title.

Notes

Post-pageant Notes 

 Hillarie Parungao competed at Miss World 2015 in Sanya, China and finished as a Top 10 semifinalist. Parungao also won the Multimedia Challenge event and placed 3rd at the People's Choice Award.
 Emma Tiglao competed at Binibining Pilipinas 2019 and was crowned Binibining Pilipinas Intercontinental 2019. Tiglao then competed at Miss Intercontinental 2019 in Egypt and finished as a Top 20 semifinalist. She also won the Miss Popularity and Miss May Care awards.
 Janelle Tee competed at Miss Philippines Earth in 2019 and was crowned Miss Philippines Earth 2019. Tee then competed at Miss Earth 2019 and finished as a Top 20 semifinalist. Tee won four silver medals for the National Costume, Swimsuit, Beach Wear, and Talent competitions.

References

External links
 Official Miss World Philippines website

World Philippines
2015 in the Philippines
2015